The Old, The New & The Best of Mary Wells is a 1983 album released by Motown singer Mary Wells on the independent label Allegiance Records. Tapping in on her stature as a sixties legend, Wells decided to re-record several of her classic Motown songs, adding in a  new wavish sound. The album was produced by Wayne Henderson who would go on to produce Rebbie Jackson's 1984 album Centipede. Only one single was released in the UK, the rerecording of "My Guy", as an extended 12" version that failed to chart. The album was rereleased on CD in 1987 featuring 5 unreleased tracks recorded during the same sessions.

Track listing

Original LP
"My Guy"
"The One Who Really Loves You"
"Two Lovers"
"You Beat Me to the Punch"
"Oh Little Boy (Look What You've Done to Me)"
"Bye Bye Baby"
"What's Easy for Two Is So Hard for One"
"What Love Has Joined Together"
"You Lost the Sweetest Boy"
"Old Love, Let's Try It Again"

1987 CD Bonus Tracks
11. "I'm A Lady"
12. "Make Up, Break Up"
13. "I Feel for You"
14. "To Feel Your Love"
15. "Money Talks"

1983 albums
Mary Wells albums
Albums produced by Wayne Henderson (musician)